A Hürthle cell is a cell in the thyroid that is often associated with Hashimoto's thyroiditis as well as benign and malignant tumors (Hürthle cell adenoma and Hürthle cell carcinoma, formerly considered a subtype of follicular thyroid cancer). This version is a relatively rare form of differentiated thyroid cancer, accounting for only 3-10% of all differentiated thyroid cancers. Oncocytes in the thyroid are often called Hürthle cells. Although the terms oncocyte, oxyphilic cell, and Hürthle cell are used interchangeably, Hürthle cell is used only to indicate cells of thyroid follicular origin.

Diseases

Hürthle cell neoplasms can be separated into Hürthle cell adenomas and carcinomas, which are respectively benign and malignant tumors arising from the follicular epithelium of the thyroid gland. The mitochondrial DNA of Hürthle cell carcinoma contain somatic mutations.  Hürthle cell carcinomas consists of at least 75% Hürthle cells. Chronic lymphocytic thyroiditis or Hashimoto's thyroiditis, along with cases of long-standing Graves' disease, show Hürthle cells present.

Diagnosis
Hürthle cell adenomas are most likely diagnosed much more frequently than Hürthle cell carcinomas. The female to male ratio for Hurthle cell adenomas is 8:1, while the ratio is 2:1 for the malignant version. Hürthle cell cancer tends to occur in older patients. The median age at diagnosis for Hürthle cell carcinomas is approximately 61 years old. Typically a painless thyroid mass is found in patients with this type of cancer. As expected, patients with carcinoma usually present larger tumors than patients with adenoma. Rarely, the cancer can spread to the lymph nodes. On few occasions, patients with Hürthle cell carcinoma have distant metastases in the lungs or surrounding bones. Hürthle cell neoplasms are somewhat difficult to differentiate between being benign or malignant. Since the size and growth pattern of the tumor cannot be used to determine malignancy, although larger tumors have higher incidence of malignancy, Hürthle cell adenomas and carcinomas have to be separated by the presence, in the case of carcinomas, or absence, in the case of adenomas, of both capsular invasion and vascular invasion. Tumors displaying only capsular invasion tend to behave less aggressively than those with vascular invasion. Hürthle cell carcinomas are characterized as either minimally invasive or widely invasive tumors. While the minimally invasive or encapsulated carcinoma is fully surrounded by a fibrous capsule, the widely invasive carcinoma shows extensive area of both capsular and vascular invasion with the leftover capsule typically difficult to identify. Classification is important since widely invasive tumors can have outcomes with a 55% mortality rate.

Histology
Hürthle cells arise from the follicular epithelium. Key features of these oncocytic cells include a granular cytoplasm that stains eosinophilic (pink on H&E stain) and a vesicular nucleus with a large nucleolus. A Hürthle cell is larger than a follicular cell, and its cellular material stains eosinophilic. Hürthle cells also tend to be large, polygonal cells with distinct cell borders. The cytoplasm of the oncocytes in Hürthle cell adenomas and carcinomas is characterized by an eosinophilic granular nature, which is commonly due to the oncocytes' high content of mitochondria. Some of these cells can contain up to 5,000 mitochondria, which fills the cytoplasm to the point of nearly excluding other organelles. This high amount of mitochondria is reported to be a result of mutations in the mitochondrial DNA. Some scientists have identified these mutations as deletions in the mitochondrial DNA of Hürthle cells found in neoplasms and Hashimoto's thyroiditis.

Treatment
A non-minimally invasive Hürthle cell carcinoma is typically treated by a total thyroidectomy followed by radioactive iodine therapy. A Hürthle cell adenoma or a minimally invasive tumor can be treated by a thyroid lobectomy, although some surgeons will perform a total thyroidectomy to prevent the tumor from reappearing and metastasizing.
A modified radical neck dissection may be performed for clinically positive lymph nodes.

History
The Hürthle cell is named after German histologist Karl Hürthle, who investigated thyroid secretory function, particularly in dogs. However, this is a misnomer since Hürthle actually described parafollicular C cells. The cell known as the Hürthle cell was first described in 1898 by Max Askanazy, who noted it in patients with Graves' disease.

See also
 Adenoma
 Oncocytoma
 Oxyphil cell

References

External links

 EndocrineWeb at endocrineweb.com
 HKU at hku.hk
 Image at upmc.edu

Cells